Alfio Caltabiano (1932–2007) was an Italian actor, screenwriter and film director.

Partial filmography

 Il principe dalla maschera rossa (1955)
 Messalina (1960)
 La strada dei giganti (1960)
 The Colossus of Rhodes (1961) - Creonte
 Barabbas (1961) - Gladiatior Trainer (uncredited)
 The Son of Captain Blood (1962) - Man fighting at Dock (uncredited)
 Colossus of the Arena (1962) - Psychios
 I Am Semiramis (1963) - Zagos, Dardanian (uncredited)
 Goliath and the Sins of Babylon (1963) - Meneos
 Kali Yug: Goddess of Vengeance (1963) - The Crie
 Il mistero del tempio indiano (1963) - The Crie
 Seven Slaves Against the World (1964) - Gladiatore
 The Revenge of Spartacus (1964)
 Two Sergeants of General Custer (1965) - Nervous Buffalo
 Seven Rebel Gladiators (1965) - Vadius 
 Erik, the Viking (1965)
 Colorado Charlie (1965) - Creonte
 L'armata Brancaleone (1966) - Arnolfo Mano-di-ferro
 Star Pilot (1966) - Artie
 Ballad of a Gunman (1967) - El Bedoja
 Comandamenti per un gangster (1968) - Five Cents
 Bootleggers (1969) - Card Player
 A Sword for Brando (1970) - The Count
 Man Called Amen (1972) - Reverend 'Ladrone' Smith
 Italian Graffiti (1973) - Bug Morano
 Oremus, Alleluia e Così Sia (1973) - Reverend Smith
 Keoma (1976) - Member of Caldwell's Gang
 California (1977) - Whittaker Accomplice (final film role)

References

Bibliography
 Roberto Curti. Italian Crime Filmography, 1968-1980. McFarland, 2013.

External links

1932 births
2007 deaths
Italian male film actors
Italian film directors
20th-century Italian screenwriters
People from Pistoia
Italian male screenwriters
20th-century Italian male writers